"Rough Justice" is a song by the English rock band the Rolling Stones that was released as a double A-side single with "Streets of Love" from their 2005 album A Bigger Bang. It is the opening track from the album. The single was released on 22 August 2005, prior to the album.

History
Written by Mick Jagger and Keith Richards, "Rough Justice" was a heavily collaborative effort like many of the lead singer and guitarist's latter-day compositions. On the writing, Richards said in 2005, "That came to me in my sleep. It's almost like "Satisfaction". Yeah, I almost sort of woke up and said, 'Where's my guitar?' Sometimes you do dream a riff, you know? I had to get up, and it's really hard to get me up. Once I go down, I go down, you know? But, I mean, it's only a song that could get me up and start running around the room, 'Where's my guitar, where did I put my guitar, before I forget it?' I don't often remember dreams, only when they're musical."

A straight ahead rocker, but sets the scene of a long time, up and down, love affair between the singer and the subject:

Recording
Recording began at La Fourchette, Posé sur Cisse, France in June 2005. With Jagger on lead vocals, Richards plays electric rhythm (including the riff). Ronnie Wood plays the song's distinct electric slide guitar, including the song's opening intro and solo. Charlie Watts plays drums. Additional musicians are included Darryl Jones on bass while Chuck Leavell on play the song's piano.

Release and aftermath
"Rough Justice" was released as a double A-side with "Streets of Love" on 22 August 2005. It charted at number 15 on the UK Singles Chart. In the US, the song peaked at number 25 on the Mainstream Rock Tracks chart and number 5 on the Adult Alternative Songs chart.

Music critic Robert Christgau applauded the song as "a strikingly ironic/acerbic expression of both Jagger's musical gift and his romantic limitations".

The song has been performed heavily by the Stones on their A Bigger Bang Tour and is featured on their latest concert DVD release, The Biggest Bang. It was also one of the three songs played by the Stones during the halftime show for Super Bowl XL although the word "cocks" was censored on the ABC broadcast.

It was included in their greatest hits album GRRR!.

Chart performance

References

External links 
 

2005 singles
The Rolling Stones songs
Songs written by Jagger–Richards
Song recordings produced by Don Was
Song recordings produced by Jagger–Richards
2005 songs